The following is a list of issue covers of TV Guide magazine from the decade of the 2020s, with dates from January 2020 to the present day.  This list reflects only the regular bi-weekly issues of TV Guide (no one-time special issues).  The entries on this table include each cover's subjects and their artists (photographer or illustrator).

2020

2021

2022

2023

References

Sources
TV Guide magazine cover archive

Covers
TV Guide covers
TV Guide covers
TV Guide